Wallace is an unincorporated community and census-designated place in Harrison County, West Virginia, United States.

It is situated on Little Ten Mile Creek, a tributary of Tenmile Creek, and has a post office with ZIP code 26448.

References

Census-designated places in Harrison County, West Virginia
Census-designated places in West Virginia